Kanigiri revenue division is an administrative division in the Prakasam district of the Indian state of Andhra Pradesh. It is one of the three revenue divisions in the district and comprises thirteen mandals. It was formed on 4 April 2022 by the Y. S. Jagan Mohan Reddy led Government of Andhra Pradesh.

Administration 
The revenue division comprises thirteen mandals: Chandrasekharapuram, Darsi, Donakonda, Hanumanthunipadu, Kanigiri, Konkanamitla, Kurichedu, Marripudi, Pamuru, Pedacherlopalli, Podili, Ponnaluru and Veligandla.

References 

Revenue divisions in Prakasam district
2022 establishments in India